Manuel Fernandes (born 11 December 1967) is a Portuguese rower. He competed in the men's lightweight coxless four event at the 1996 Summer Olympics.

References

1967 births
Living people
Portuguese male rowers
Olympic rowers of Portugal
Rowers at the 1996 Summer Olympics
Place of birth missing (living people)